The 2020–21 FC Sochaux-Montbéliard season was the club's 93rd season in existence and its seventh consecutive season in the second division of French football. In addition to the domestic league, Sochaux participated in this season's edition of the Coupe de France. The season covered the period from 1 July 2020 to 30 June 2021.

Players

First-team squad

Out on loan

Reserve squad

Pre-season and friendlies

Competitions

Overview

Ligue 2

League table

Results summary

Results by round

Matches
The league fixtures were announced on 9 July 2020.

Coupe de France

Statistics

Goalscorers

References

External links

FC Sochaux-Montbéliard seasons
Sochaux